This is a list of flag bearers who have represented Samoa at the Olympics.

Flag bearers carry the national flag of their country at the opening ceremony of the Olympic Games.

See also
Samoa at the Olympics

References

Samoa at the Olympics
Samoa
Olympic flagbearers